Yasawa, also called Assawa and Ysava,  is the northernmost large island of the Yasawa Group, an archipelago in Fiji's Western Division. The population was 1,120 in 1983.

The islands are served by the Yasawa Island Airport.

References 

Ba Province
Islands of Fiji
Yasawa Islands